Pristoceuthophilus is a genus of insect in family Rhaphidophoridae named by James A. G. Rehn in 1903.

It contains the following species:
Pristoceuthophilus arizonae Hebard, 1935
Pristoceuthophilus celatus (Scudder, 1894)
Pristoceuthophilus cercalis Caudell, 1916
Pristoceuthophilus gaigei Hubbell, 1925
Pristoceuthophilus marmoratus Rehn, 1904
Pristoceuthophilus pacificus (Thomas, 1872)
Pristoceuthophilus polluticornis (Scudder, 1899)
Pristoceuthophilus salebrosus (Scudder, 1899)
Pristoceuthophilus sargentae Gurney, 1947
Pristoceuthophilus tuberculatus (Caudell, 1908)
Pristoceuthophilus unispinosus (Brunner, 1888)
The Samwell Cave cricket has not been formally described, but is also assigned to this genus.

References

Ensifera genera
Rhaphidophoridae
Taxonomy articles created by Polbot